The Maryland Transit Administration provides the primary public bus service for the Baltimore metropolitan area and commuter bus service in other parts of the state of Maryland. There are currently 76 bus routes, which include 45 LocalLink routes, 12 High Frequency CityLink Routes routes, 8 express bus routes (which operate from various suburbs to downtown Baltimore), 19 commuter bus routes, and 5 Intercounty Connector or "ICC" routes (which operate from various locations mainly in central Maryland to Washington D.C. or various Metrorail stations). The local and commuter bus routes operate in conjunction with one subway line, three light rail lines, MARC train service, and various connections to other transit agencies.

Operation
The MTA's bus service operates throughout the Baltimore-Washington Metropolitan Area and other parts of the state. These include: 12 CityLink High Frequency Color Routes. In addition to LocalLink routes 21 through 95; Express BusLink routes 103, 105, 115, 120, 150, 154, 160, and 163; Intercounty Connector routes 201 through 205; Commuter bus routes 310 through 995.
https://mta.maryland.gov/local-bus

Local buses
In June 2017 as part of MD Gov. Larry Hogan's initiative to have a better transit system in Baltimore he launched BaltimoreLink.

Local bus lines are identified with a one- or two-digit number. Many of the numerical designations have origins dating back to the days of the Baltimore streetcars and share the route numbers of the respective streetcars that operated along the same streets.

Most local buses operate regular service seven days a week throughout most hours of the day and evening. Some routes operate 24 hours. A small number of routes operate without evening service, on weekdays only, during peak hours only, or only at the times needed for certain employers.

Until 2009, a series of routes operated in the northwest part of the city and suburbs known as Metro connection buses. These routes had designations of the letter M followed by a number, and operated from a Metro station to a specified location or between two Metro stations. When the Metro connection bus service began in 1984, it used designations beginning with the letter M (Mondawmin), R (Rogers Avenue), or P (Plaza), followed by a number. After the Metro was extended to Owings Mills in 1987, only the letter M was used, and it denoted "Metro."

Since 1988, the number of M-lines had declined, as many of them were consolidated, and some were eliminated. After the first phase of the Greater Baltimore Bus Initiative took effect in 2005, only seven M-lines remained, though this increased to eight after Route M-6 was restored months later.

Throughout 2008 and 2009, all M-lines were renamed to plain two-digit numerical designations, ranging from 52 to 54 and 56 to 60. During this series of revisions, route changes were also made to some of them, including merging some, splitting others, and eliminating part of Route M-17 without any replacement.

Express, Commuter, and Intercounty Connector buses
The MTA's express routes should not be confused with the "express" trips assigned to several of the local bus routes. Express routes are dedicated to providing rapid service by limiting the number of stops along the route.  The number of express routes has declined over the past two decades as new rapid transit services have been constructed, and poor-performing routes were eliminated or consolidated.

Unlike the commuter buses, express bus routes serve areas where local buses are available. Comparable slower trips can also be accomplished with local buses. Commuter routes, however, provide service between locations not connected by local bus routes.

Both the express and commuter routes, identified with 3-digit numbers, offer limited service mostly during weekday rush hour between downtown Baltimore or Washington and various Park-and-Ride lots or other suburban locations in the state of Maryland. The commuter routes, designated with higher numbers, are operated by contractors rather than MTA employees.

The newest addition to the commuter bus service since 2010, known as Intercounty Connector or ICC for short, operates from Gaithersburg to BWI Marshall Airport, University of Maryland College Park or DoD/Fort Meade, traveling along the newly built Intercounty Connector expressway in central Maryland.

Neighborhood Shuttle Bug
Two of the local routes MTA operates are considered neighborhood shuttles, also known as Shuttle Bugs. These local routes  focus on a specific neighborhood and the transportation of persons within these communities.

During the early 2000s, MTA introduced two such routes. These routes, rather than operating like others around town, have differences that include:
Reduced fare for a single ride: $1.00 rather than the $1.60 charged on regular buses. MTA unlimited ride passes (also known as "GO-passes") also cover the fare.
In 2006, three shorter, distinctively painted buses, 30-foot Opus buses were purchased and are used exclusively by the Mondawmin shuttle. The Opus buses are the only non 40- and 60-foot buses in MTA's fleet; held at Northwest (4) garage. In mid-2011, MTA retired the three 30-foot Opus buses due to reliability issues.
Schedules are printed in full color, rather than the monochrome design of most printed schedules, in order to attract more riders.
Bus stop signs have unique identifications different from usual bus stops. The Hampden Shuttle is identified by a ladybug, and the Mondawmin Shuttle uses the grasshopper symbol.

The Hampden Shuttle Bug was the first of seven shuttle routes originally planned for Baltimore and its suburbs. Only the Hampden and Mondawmin routes were implemented; no timetable was ever set for other neighborhood shuttle routes.

A proposed Shuttle Bug route between Randallstown and the Owings Mills Metro Subway Station was fought by residents along the route the shuttle would take. Objections included that the service would operate on quiet residential streets not accustomed to bus traffic, and area residents did not need the service.

In 2005 and 2006, in various phases of the Greater Baltimore Bus Initiative, MTA proposed various changes to these routes which included routing changes and threats to eliminate Route 98 completely and reduce service on Route 97 to once an hour. The only change that was actually made was a shift on Route 98 in 2008 to replace service on Roland Avenue, that was lost through a change to Route 27.

In 2017, shuttle bug service was discontinued as part of BaltimoreLink. Route 97 was replaced by LocalLink 82. Most of Route 98's routing was replaced by LocalLink 21.

QuickBus
In 2005, MTA introduced a new form of express transit, known as “rapid bus service.”  The first of these services was designated Route 40.  The line operates every 10–15 minutes from the western to the eastern suburbs of Baltimore through the downtown area, serving various communities in West and East Baltimore.  Stops are limited to major intersections, transfer points, and points of interest.  Unlike other express buses, local fares are applicable on Route 40.  Route 40 was later named "QuickBus."

In 2009, a new "QuickBus" route was introduced.  Designated as QuickBus 48, it operates along the same route as Route 8 minus the section north of Towson Town Center.  Introduction of another QuickBus service that would operate along the route Route 3 and would have carry the designation "Route 43", but this proposal was delayed.

Two more QuickBus routes began service on August 30, 2010, until June 17, 2017. QuickBus 46 operates alongside routes 5 and 10 from Paradise Avenue loop to Cedonia Loop. QuickBus 47 travel along the route 15 from Walbrook Junction to Overlea Loop. Both buses operate on weekdays at peak hours only.

In 2017, all QuickBus routes were discontinued as part of BaltimoreLink. All routes were replaced by LocalLink service.

In 2022, MTA Maryland proposed a plan to reintroduce QuickBus-like service with a new branding under "QuickLink" to be included into Fall 2022 service changes. The service proposal would include an east–west limited-stop bus route as a pilot service named QuickLink 40. QuickLink 40 would operate every 20 minutes during peak and every 30 minutes during midday from North Bend to Essex Park & Ride. The pilot service was placed on hold as MDOT MTA focuses on improving system wide reliability, but could be included in future service changes.

Current bus routes

Fares

See: Current MTA Fares

Fleet roster

Current fleet roster

On Order

Special Bus Fleet

Bus yards
MTA local bus service in Baltimore is divided into four divisions, each served by its own maintenance yard. The first digit of a bus's "block number", attached to the bottom right corner of its windshield (from inside of bus), indicates its "base" division. The buses also feature a small letter suffix to the fleet series number. The letter represent the 'first letter' of the division's "name" from where the bus is based.

References

External links
 Official MTA website

Maryland Transit Administration